Iran's House of Art is a University of Minnesota-affiliated non-profit organization dedicated to improving the public's understanding of Iran by arranging for art exhibitions, film screenings, lectures and concerts by Iranian musicians. Originally conceived by Aida Shahghasemi, the organization was established in the 2007–2008 academic year, and has held a number of successful events at the university, beginning with "Merge: Harmony of Mystic Words".

References

External links

U of M Student Unions and Activities Page
University of Minnesota, Twin Cities

Iranian-American culture
University of Minnesota
Arts organizations based in Minneapolis
Arts organizations established in 2007
2007 establishments in Minnesota